The 1985–86 DDR-Oberliga was the 37th season of the DDR-Oberliga, the first tier of league football in East Germany.

The league was contested by fourteen teams. BFC Dynamo won the championship, the club's eighth of ten consecutive East German championships from 1978 to 1988.

Ralf Sträßer of 1. FC Union Berlin was the league's top scorer with 14 goals, while René Müller of 1. FC Lokomotive Leipzig took out the seasons East German Footballer of the year award.

On the strength of the 1985–86 title BFC Dynamo qualified for the 1986–87 European Cup where the club was knocked out by Brøndby IF in the second round. Second-placed club 1. FC Lokomotive Leipzig qualified for the 1986–87 European Cup Winners' Cup as the seasons FDGB-Pokal winners and advanced all the way to the final where it lost to Ajax. Third-placed FC Carl Zeiss Jena qualified for the 1986–87 UEFA Cup where it was knocked out by Bayer 05 Uerdingen in the first round while fourth-placed 1. FC Magdeburg lost to Athletic Bilbao in the first round and fifth-placed Stahl Brandenburg was eliminated by IFK Göteborg in the second round.

Table									
The 1985–86 season saw two newly promoted clubs, 1. FC Union Berlin and BSG Sachsenring Zwickau.

Results

References

Sources

External links
 Das Deutsche Fussball Archiv  Historic German league tables

Ober
1985-86
1